Czesław Lang (born 17 May 1955 in Kołczygłowy) is a Polish former road racing cyclist.

He was a bronze medalist at the 1977 UCI Road World Championships in San Cristóbal and a silver medalist at the 1979 UCI Road World Championships in Valkenburg, both in the men's amateur team time trial. He was also the winner of the 1980 edition of the Tour de Pologne.

He competed for Poland at the 1976 Summer Olympics in Montreal and the 1980 Summer Olympics held in Moscow, Soviet Union in the individual road race, where he finished in second place.

Since 1993, he has been the Director of the Tour de Pologne.

References

External links

 

1955 births
Living people
Polish male cyclists
Olympic cyclists of Poland
Olympic silver medalists for Poland
Cyclists at the 1976 Summer Olympics
Cyclists at the 1980 Summer Olympics
People from Bytów County
Kashubians
Olympic medalists in cycling
Sportspeople from Pomeranian Voivodeship
Medalists at the 1980 Summer Olympics